Nathan Harvey House is a historic home located at Mill Hall in Clinton County, Pennsylvania, United States. It was built about 1804, and is a two-story, rectangular stone dwelling, seven bays wide.  It has a gable roof and exemplifies Georgian style design characteristics.  It features a full-width front porch.  It was built by Mill Hall's first settler and founding father Nathan Harvey.

It was listed on the National Register of Historic Places in 1985.

References 

Houses on the National Register of Historic Places in Pennsylvania
Georgian architecture in Pennsylvania
Houses completed in 1804
Houses in Clinton County, Pennsylvania
National Register of Historic Places in Clinton County, Pennsylvania